South Hill is a summit in the U.S. state of Nevada.

South Hill was named for the fact it is south of other nearby summits.

References

Mountains of Eureka County, Nevada